Tmesisternus triangularis is a species of beetle in the family Cerambycidae. It was described by Stephan von Breuning in 1953. It is known from Papua New Guinea.

References

triangularis
Beetles described in 1953